Woo Sang-ho (born 7 December 1992) is a South Korean footballer, he currently play in FC Osaka.

Career
Woo Sang-ho begin his career at youth team of Kashiwa Reysol.

In July 2016, Woo signed with Daegu FC after a one-year spell in Montenegro.

In 2022, Woo signed with FC Osaka. On 20 November 2022, he brought his club promoted to J3 League for the first time in history.

References

External links 

1992 births
Living people
Association football midfielders
South Korean footballers
South Korean expatriate footballers
OFK Petrovac players
Daegu FC players
FC Gifu players
Ehime FC players
Tochigi SC players
Montenegrin First League players
K League 2 players
J2 League players
Expatriate footballers in Montenegro
Meikai University alumni
Zainichi Korean people